Shir Kuh or Shirkuh is a high peak in the central part of Iran about  south-west of the city of Yazd in Yazd Province. The first woman to climb the mountain was Banoo Khosrawy.

Geology
Geologically, Shir Kuh is made chiefly of Jurassic granite surrounded by Cretaceous rocks. It is located almost in the vicinity of the Sahand-Bazman volcanic arc, a volcanic arc that was formed during the Tertiary and mainly in the Eocene volcanism. Shir Kuh consists mainly of intrusive rocks (Jurassic granite) that were made in the Late Cimmerian Orogeny in the Late Jurassic. This mountain is located in the Sanandaj-Sirjan geological and structural zone. Sanadaj-Sirjan was subjected to magmatism and metamorphism in the Paleozoic and Mesozoic.

This section along with other Iranian microplates were separated from Gondwana in the Carboniferous (when magmatism was caused by rifting and the process of detachment) and moved northwards. From the Early Jurassic to the Middle Miocene Sandaj-Sirjan was adjacent to a subduction zone and there was magmatism because of the subduction zone which was situated in the south and south-west of this structural zone. Consequently, in the Late Jurassic, Sanandaj-Sirjan region was subjected to the magmatism of the Late Cimmerian Orogeny in the form of both volcanism and plutonism. Shir Kuh was formed as a result of the plutonism of this orogenic phase.

Climate
Having a high elevation, Shir Kuh and its neighbourhood have a cold mountain climate although the region is placed in a location that is surrounded by a hot semi-desert climate.

See also 
 List of Ultras of West Asia

References

External links
Shirkuh Tour
 History Excerpts 
 Photo
 "Shir Kuh, Iran" on Peakbagger
 Shir Kuh weather on Mountain-Forecast

Mountains of Iran
Landforms of Yazd Province
Mountains of Yazd Province